Mizhhiria is an urban-type settlement in Khust Raion of Zakarpattia Oblast in western Ukraine. The town is also the administrative center of Mizhhiria Raion (district), housing the district's local administration buildings. The town's population was 9,656 as of the 2001 Ukrainian Census. Current population: .

The settlement was first mentioned in 1415 as a possession of the Hungarian feudal lords. It was part of the Kingdom of Hungary (from the 11th century to 1918 and from 1938–1944) as the settlement of Ökörmező in the Máramaros County and Ökörmező District. From 1918 to 1938, the settlement was a part of Czechoslovakia as Volove (However Ruthenians used Mežhorje). In 1947, its status was upgraded to that of an urban-type settlement. It was renamed "Mizhhiria" in 1953.

References

External links

Gallery

Urban-type settlements in Khust Raion